Mimodoxa dryina is a moth in the family Cosmopterigidae. It was described by Oswald Bertram Lower in 1901. It is found in eastern Australia.

References

Cosmopteriginae
Moths described in 1901